Alena Ivanova (née Omelchenko, born ) is a Kazakhstani volleyball player. She is part of the Kazakhstan women's national volleyball team.

She participated in the 2010 FIVB Volleyball Women's World Championship, and the 2014 FIVB Volleyball World Grand Prix.
On club level she played for Zhetyssu in 2014.

References

External links

1989 births
Living people
Kazakhstani women's volleyball players
Place of birth missing (living people)
21st-century Kazakhstani women